Simon Texas Silverholt (born 17 June 1993) is a Swedish professional footballer who plays as a winger.

References

1993 births
Living people
Swedish footballers
Halmstads BK players
GAIS players
IFK Mariehamn players
IL Hødd players
Tvååkers IF players
Association football wingers
Allsvenskan players
Superettan players
Veikkausliiga players
Norwegian Second Division players
Swedish expatriate footballers
Expatriate footballers in Finland
Swedish expatriate sportspeople in Finland
Expatriate footballers in Norway
Swedish expatriate sportspeople in Norway